José Manuel García Maurin (born 13 January 1997) is a Spanish footballer who plays as a winger for Extremadura UD.

Club career

Osasuna
García was born in Pamplona, Navarre. In 2003, the lifelong CA Osasuna supporter appeared in a TV show called El Día Después from Canal+, after a supporting act in a game against Athletic Bilbao, and joined the former's youth system five years later, aged 11.

On 8 November 2013, before even having appeared for the B-side, García made his professional debut, playing the last 24 minutes of a 0–1 La Liga home loss against UD Almería. Aged 16 years and 299 days, he was the third-youngest player to play his first match for the club.

García renewed his contract with Osasuna on 21 July 2015, signing until 2018. On 14 July of the following year, however, he left after failing to agree to new terms.

Alcoyano / Extremadura
On 3 August 2016, García signed for Segunda División B side CD Alcoyano. On 10 January 2018, he moved to fellow league team Extremadura UD.

García contributed with 15 appearances for Extremadura, as his side achieved promotion to the second division for the first time ever. On 22 August 2018, he joined Salamanca CF in the third division on loan for one year.

On 30 July 2019, García moved to fellow third division side CD Atlético Baleares also in a temporary deal. The following 25 January, he moved to Pontevedra CF on loan for the remainder of the campaign.

References

External links

1997 births
Living people
Footballers from Pamplona
Spanish footballers
Association football wingers
La Liga players
Segunda División players
Segunda División B players
Tercera División players
CA Osasuna players
CA Osasuna B players
CD Alcoyano footballers
Extremadura UD footballers
Salamanca CF UDS players
CD Atlético Baleares footballers
Pontevedra CF footballers